Merbury is a surname. Notable people with the surname include:

 Laurence Merbury (died after 1423), English-born Irish statesman
 Nicholas Merbury (died 1421), English administrator and MP

See also
 Marbury (surname)